Caspiosoma caspium is a species of Ponto-Caspian goby native to the deltas of rivers inflows to the north-western Black Sea: Dnieper up to Berislav, also in the Dnieper-Bug Estuary and Berezan Estuary, Danube, Dniester with the estuary, Cuciurgan Reservoir. Found in the delta of the Don River, Volga, central and northern parts of the Caspian Sea and rivers flowing into the Sea of Azov. This species can reach a length of  TL. It is currently the only known member of its genus.

References

External links
 AQUATAB 
 World Register of Marine Species

Benthophilinae
Freshwater fish of Europe
Fish of the Black Sea
Fish of the Caspian Sea
Fish of Europe
Fish described in 1877